Ahmed Saif (born 1 January 1983) is a former Qatari professional snooker player. He was the first professional player from Qatar. Saif was a professional between 2013 and 2015, reaching a highest ranking of 113 in the world.

Career

Amateur
Saif as an amateur represented the Qatari national snooker team at the 2002, 2006 and 2010 Asian Games, 2009 and 2013 Asian Indoor Games. Saif had success in the 2011 Pan Arab Games where he won a silver medal in the snooker singles, losing to Iraqi Firas Al-Shamini in the final, he also won a bronze in the team event alongside Ali Al Obaidly and Mohsen Bukshaisha.

Saif also appeared as a wildcard in 2008 Bahrain Championship, where he lost 5–1 to Robert Milkins in the wildcard round. He also appeared in the opening two Players Tour Championship events in the 2010/2011 season, however he lost both of them 4–0 to Andrew Higginson and Jamie Clarke.

Professional
Saif entered the Q School at the end of the 2012–13 season in an attempt to become Qatar's first professional snooker player. In the first event he beat fellow countryman Mohsen Bukshaisha, before falling to Shane Castle in the last 64. However, with wins over Zack Richardson, Duane Jones, Michael Georgiou, Antony Parsons and Jamie Clarke in the second event, Saif reached the semi-final stages and won a place on the main tour for the 2013–14 and 2014–15 seasons.

Saif was to endure a difficult debut season as a professional, as he failed to win a single match, winning only fourteen frames in fourteen matches, six of which came in his 10–6 loss to Scott Donaldson in the 2014 World Snooker Championship first qualifying round. He finished the season ranked 130.

Saif's first match win as a professional came in January 2015 at the minor-ranking Xuzhou Open over Chinese amateur Long Yun. Later, he achieved his first win in a full ranking event, beating Anthony Hamilton 4–0 at the 2015 Welsh Open, closing out the match with a 95 break which is the highest of his career in competitive play. However, Saif was whitewashed in the next round 4–0 by Alan McManus. He ended his stint on the tour ranked world number 117 and failed to come through Q School in an attempt to win his place back.

Performance and Rankings timeline

References

External links
 
 Profile on ProSnookerBlog.com

Qatari snooker players
Place of birth unknown
1983 births
Living people
Cue sports players at the 2002 Asian Games
Cue sports players at the 2006 Asian Games
Cue sports players at the 2010 Asian Games
Asian Games competitors for Qatar